Daniel Eugene Quill (December 15, 1927 – December 8, 1988) was an American jazz alto saxophonist who played often with Phil Woods in the duet Phil and Quill. Quill also worked as a sideman for Buddy DeFranco, Quincy Jones, Gene Krupa, Gerry Mulligan, and Claude Thornhill. In 1988, Quill died at the age of 60 in his hometown of Atlantic City, New Jersey.

Discography

As leader 
 Gene Quill 'The Tiger': Portrait of a Great Alto Player (Fresh Sound, 1955)
 3 Bones and a Quill (Vogue, 1959)
 Jazzville Vol. 1 (Dawn, 1956)

With Phil Woods
 Pairing Off (Prestige, 1956)
 Phil and Quill (RCA Victor, 1957)
 Phil and Quill with Prestige (Prestige, 1957)
 Phil Talks with Quill (Epic, 1959)
 Bird Feathers (Prestige, 1957)
 Four Altos with Sahib Shihab and Hal Stein (Prestige, 1958)

As sideman 
With Manny Albam
 Play Music from West Side Story (Coral, 1957)
 Steve's Songs (Dot, 1958)
 Jazz Horizons: Jazz New York (Coral, 1958)
 The Blues Is Everybody's Business (Coral, 1958)
 Jazz Goes to the Movies (Impulse!, 1962)

With Bob Brookmeyer
 Brookmeyer (Vik, 1957)
 Portrait of the Artist (Atlantic, 1960)
 Gloomy Sunday and Other Bright Moments (Verve, 1961)

With Al Cohn
 East Coast – West Coast Scene (RCA Victor, 1955)
 Mr. Music (RCA Victor, 1955)
 The Sax Section (Epic, 1956)
 Son of Drum Suite (RCA Victor, 1961)

With Michel Legrand
 Legrand Jazz (Philips, 1958)
 Michel Legrand Meets Miles Davis (Philips, 1970)

With Gerry Mulligan
 The Concert Jazz Band (Verve, 1960)
 Gerry Mulligan and the Concert Jazz Band at the Village Vanguard (Verve, 1961)
 Gerry Mulligan Presents a Concert in Jazz (Verve, 1961)
 Gerry Mulligan and the Concert Jazz Band on Tour (Verve, 1962)
 Gerry Mulligan '63 (Verve, 1963)

With Joe Newman
 I'm Still Swinging (RCA Victor, 1955)
 I Feel Like a Newman (Storyville, 1956)
 New Sounds in Swing with Billy Byers (Jazztone, 1956)
 East Coast Sounds (Jazztone, 1957)

With Johnny Richards
 Wide Range (Capitol, 1957)
 Experiments in Sound (Capitol, 1958)
 Walk Softly/Run Wild (Coral, 1959)

With others
 Steve Allen, Steve Allen Plays Neal Hefti (Coral, 1958)
 Buddy Arnold, Wailing (ABC-Paramount, 1956)
 Gil Evans, Into the Hot (Impulse!, 1962)
 Dick Garcia, A Message from Garcia (Dawn, 1956)
 Billie Holiday, Billie Holiday (MGM, 1959)
 Quincy Jones, This Is How I Feel About Jazz (ABC Paramount, 1957)
 Teddi King, Now in Vogue (Vogue, 1955)
 Jimmy Knepper, A Swinging Introduction to Jimmy Knepper (Bethlehem, 1957)
 Mundell Lowe, A Grand Night for Swinging (Riverside, 1957)
 Oscar Pettiford, Winner's Circle (Bethlehem, 1957)
 Pony Poindexter, Pony's Express (Epic, 1962)
 Bill Potts, The Jazz Soul of Porgy & Bess (United Artists, 1959)
 Buddy Rich, Swingin' New Big Band (Pacific Jazz, 1966)
 Jimmy Rushing, Five Feet of Soul (Colpix, 1963)
 Hal Schaefer, UA Showcase: Great Songs from United Artists Pictures (London, 1958)
 Claude Thornhill, Claude Thornhill and His Orchestra Play the Great Jazz Arrangements of Gerry Mulligan and Ralph Aldrich (Trend, 1953)
 George Williams, Put on Your Dancing Shoes (United Artists, 1960)

References 

American jazz alto saxophonists
American male saxophonists
1988 deaths
1927 births
20th-century American saxophonists
20th-century American male musicians
American male jazz musicians